Graniti is a station of Line C of Rome Metro. It is located at the intersection of Via Graniti with Via Tortorici, in the Roman frazione of Borgata Finocchio. It used to be a train station of the Rome-Pantano railway line until 2008, when rebuilding works commenced. With the inauguration of Line C, the stop re-opened on 9 November 2014. This station also serves the nearby depot of the line's rolling stock, and it extends over 21.7 hectares.

Among the other things, the premises host the maintenance and control centre of Line C.

External links

References

Rome Metro Line C stations
Railway stations opened in 2014
2014 establishments in Italy
Railway stations in Italy opened in the 21st century